Samantha Harper may refer to:

Samantha Harper, see List of Little House on the Prairie characters
Samantha Harper, character in Abandon (film)
Samantha Harper (actress) in Neil Simon's I Ought to Be in Pictures (film)